Layia platyglossa, commonly called coastal tidytips, is an annual wildflower of the family Asteraceae, native to western North America.

Distribution
Tidytips was formerly found throughout low-elevation dry habitats in California including the Mojave Desert and into Arizona and Utah. In pre-European times this plant was common in solid stands at lower elevations. Found in grassy valley floors, slopes of hills,  openings in coastal sage scrub and chaparral, coastal plains, and in the High Desert. A member of Spring wildflower 'displays,' blooming March to June.

This species is also found in Mexico, in the state of Baja California. It can be commonly found from Tijuana south to the Sierra de La Asamblea in the central part of the state. It is also found on Guadalupe Island in the Pacific Ocean.

Description
Layia platyglossa is an annual, glandular, daisy like plant with narrow, rough hairy leaves. The roots are usually taproots, sometimes fibrous.

The leaves at the upper part of the stem are short and have a pilous texture. The leaves at the basal part of the stem can be dentate to pinnate shaped with rotund short lobes. The lower leaves are generally lobed and the upper leaves are entire. Leaves usually alternate or opposite, and the blades are usually simple, rarely compound.

Flowers
The plant is an indeterminate zygomorphic inflorescent, individual heads are borne on a peduncle. The stems are usually erect, prostrate or decumbent to ascending, and are stout and corymbed branched.

The flower heads are composed of five to eighteen yellow ray flowers with white tips and many central yellow disk flowers. Its outer ray flowers are bright golden yellow with distinct, sharp-margined white tips. The bracts tips are rounded and involucre 6–12 mm high. The corolla is 4–6 mm long. The ray flowers are 3–3.8 mm long and the disk flowers are 2.8–5 mm long. The ligules are 6–15 mm long and 5–10 mm wide.   The florets are bisexual, pistillate, functionally staminate or neuter. The sepals are highly modified.

Pollination is done by insects. The fruits are usually dry with thick, tough pericarps, sometimes rostrate and/or winged. Dispersion is done by the help from pappi (dispersal of fruit by wind).  Seeds are one per fruit, embryos straight.

Cultivation
Ornamental
Layia platyglossa is cultivated as an ornamental plant. It is often an ingredient in commercial wildflower seed mixes. The daisy-like flowers are attractive, making it a popular annual flower in traditional gardens, wildlife gardens, and habitat gardens.

Restoration
The wildflower is used in habitat restoration projects, and is a pollinator supportive plant. The ripe seeds are a food source for birds.

Gallery

References

Abrams, Leroy, and Stinchfield, Roxana; "Illustrated Flora of the Pacific States. Vol IV: Bignonias to Sunflowers" — California: Stanford University Press, 1960.

External links
Jepson Manual Treatment  — Layia platyglossa
Calflora Database: Layia platyglossa
USDA Plants Profile for Layia platyglossa (tidy tips) — plant data, distribution map. 
Layia platyglossa — U.C. Calphoto gallery

platyglossa
Flora of Arizona
Flora of California
Flora of Utah
Flora of Baja California
Flora of Mexican Pacific Islands
Flora of the California desert regions
Flora of the Klamath Mountains
Natural history of the California Coast Ranges
Natural history of the Central Valley (California)
Natural history of the Mojave Desert
Natural history of the Peninsular Ranges
Natural history of the Santa Monica Mountains
Bird food plants
Garden plants of North America
Flora without expected TNC conservation status